The Sock Knitter is a 1915 painting by the Australian artist Grace Cossington Smith. The painting depicts a woman, believed to be the artist's sister, knitting a sock. It was the first work by Cossington Smith to be exhibited and has been "acclaimed as the first post-impressionist painting to be exhibited in Australia."

The work was included in the Follow the Flag exhibition  held at the National Gallery of Victoria in 2015. Exhibition material stated that The Sock Knitter "has come to symbolise Australian women’s contribution to the [First World War] effort, which included knitting more than 1.3 million pairs of socks".

The painting was acquired by the Art Gallery of New South Wales in 1960.

References

External links
The Sock Knitter - Art Gallery of New South Wales

1915 paintings
Paintings by Grace Cossington Smith
Collections of the Art Gallery of New South Wales
Post-impressionist paintings
Portraits by Australian artists